The Men's Qatar Classic 2015 is the men's edition of the 2015 Qatar Classic squash tournament, which is a PSA World Series event ($150,000 prize money). The event took place in Doha from 31 October to 6 November. Mohamed El Shorbagy won his second Qatar Classic trophy, beating Grégory Gaultier in the final.

Prize money and ranking points
For 2015, the prize purse is $150,000. The prize money and points breakdown is as follows:

Seeds

Draw and results

See also
Qatar Classic
Women's Qatar Classic 2015
2015–16 PSA World Series

References

External links
PSA Qatar Classic 2015 website
Qatar Classic 2015 Squashsite website
Qatar Squash Federation website

Men's Qatar Classic (squash)
Men's Qatar Classic (squash)
Squash tournaments in Qatar